Lindy Waters III (born July 28, 1997) is an American professional basketball player for the Oklahoma City Thunder of the National Basketball Association (NBA). He played college basketball for the Oklahoma State Cowboys.

High school career
Waters attended Norman North High School. During his senior year, he posed for a picture with an Airsoft gun after losing a bet with friends. Waters was expelled after the incident and transferred to Sunrise Christian Academy. After several months, he was allowed to return to Norman North and re-joined the basketball team, helping the team reach the state title game. In November 2015, Waters committed to playing college basketball for Oklahoma State.

College career
During his freshman year, Waters sustained a concussion and a fractured foot that caused him to miss several games. He averaged 5.7 points per game on a team that reached the NCAA Tournament. As a sophomore, Waters averaged 8.7 points and 3.7 rebounds per game. In August 2018, he was named "Indian of the Year" by an Intertribal Council. Waters averaged 12.2 points, 4.2 rebounds, and 2.8 assists per game as a junior. As a senior, Waters averaged 10.5 points, 4.2 rebounds and 2.4 assists per game.

Professional career

Enid Outlaws (2021)
After going undrafted in the 2020 NBA draft, Waters signed with the Enid Outlaws of The Basketball League on March 31, 2021. In 17 games, he averaged 12.6 points, 4.9 assists and 5.4 rebounds per game. On July 6, 2021, he signed with Palmer Alma Mediterránea of the LEB Oro. However, the contract was voided on August 14 due to bureaucratic problems.

Oklahoma City Blue (2021–2022)
In October 2021, Waters joined the Oklahoma City Blue of the NBA G League after a successful tryout. He averaged 8.3 points, 3.3 rebounds, 1.1 assists and 1.11 steals per game for the Blue.

Oklahoma City Thunder (2022–present)
On February 10, 2022, Waters was signed to a two-way contract by his hometown team the Oklahoma City Thunder.

On February 27, 2023, the Thunder converted Waters' deal into a multi-year standard contract. He was assigned to the Oklahoma City Blue of the NBA G League on March 2, 2023.

Career statistics

NBA

|-
| style="text-align:left;"| 
| style="text-align:left;"| Oklahoma City
| 25 || 1 || 18.6 || .406 || .363 || .800 || 2.9 || 1.0 || .8 || .3 || 8.0
|- class="sortbottom"
| style="text-align:center;" colspan="2"| Career
| 25 || 1 || 18.6 || .406 || .363 || .800 || 2.9 || 1.0 || .8 || .3 || 8.0

College

|-
| style="text-align:left;"| 2016–17
| style="text-align:left;"| Oklahoma State
| 23 || 12 || 16.0 || .495 || .442 || .714 || 1.8 || .8 || .6 || .0 || 5.7
|-
| style="text-align:left;"| 2017–18
| style="text-align:left;"| Oklahoma State
| 35 || 31 || 27.1 || .443 || .373 || .768 || 3.7 || 2.0 || .9 || .4 || 8.7
|-
| style="text-align:left;"| 2018–19
| style="text-align:left;"| Oklahoma State
| 32 || 32 || 33.8 || .437 || .448 || .878 || 4.2 || 2.8 || 1.3 || .2 || 12.2
|-
| style="text-align:left;"| 2019–20
| style="text-align:left;"| Oklahoma State
| 31 || 30 || 31.7 || .381 || .317 || .825 || 4.2 || 2.4 || 1.2 || .1 || 10.5
|- class="sortbottom"
| style="text-align:center;" colspan="2"| Career
| 121 || 105 || 27.9 || .427 || .390 || .817 || 3.6 || 2.1 || 1.0 || .2 || 9.5

Personal life
Waters is an enrolled member of the Kiowa tribe and Cherokee descent.

References

External links
Oklahoma State Cowboys bio

1997 births
Living people
American men's basketball players
Basketball players from Oklahoma
Oklahoma City Blue players
Oklahoma City Thunder players
Oklahoma State Cowboys basketball players
Shooting guards
Sportspeople from Norman, Oklahoma
Undrafted National Basketball Association players